Trillium viridescens, also known as the Ozark trillium or tapertip wakerobin, is a species of flowering plant in the family Melanthiaceae. It is found in parts of Arkansas, Missouri, Oklahoma, Kansas, Texas and Louisiana. It usually grows in rich deciduous forests and mountain ranges where the soil is clayey and calcareous. 

Trillium viridescens is a perennial herbaceous plant that blooms early April to mid May.
The flower usually has bi-colored petals, purplish near the base and green above.

Bibliography

References

External links

 
 

viridescens
Flora of the North-Central United States
Flora of the United States
Flora of Louisiana
Flora of Texas
Taxa named by Thomas Nuttall